The 2019 World Wushu Championships was the 15th edition of the World Wushu Championships. It was held at the Minhang Gymnasium in Shanghai, China from October 20 to October 23, 2019.

Medal summary

Medal table

Men's taolu

Men's sanda

Women's taolu

Women's sanda

Creative group-set event
The results of this event were not added to the combined medal table of the championships.

References

External links 

 Official website



World Wushu Championships
Wushu Championships
World Wushu Championships
2019 in wushu (sport)
Sports competitions in Shanghai
World Wushu Championships
Wushu competitions in China